{{DISPLAYTITLE:C16H23NO2}}
The molecular formula C16H23NO2 (molar mass : 261.36 g/mol) may refer to:

 Bufuralol
 Ethoheptazine
 Etoxadrol
 Hexylcaine
 Idropranolol
 Isopropylphenidate
 Metheptazine
 4'-Methoxy-α-pyrrolidinopentiophenone
 Piperocaine
 Prodine (Betaprodine)
 Properidine
 Propylketobemidone
 Propylphenidate